Benjamin Gerald Hinshelwood (born 22 March 1977 in Melbourne) is a Scottish international rugby union player. He is the son of winger Sandy Hinshelwood. He attended North Sydney Boys High School. He joined the University of Sydney Rugby Union team where as a centre, and helped secure the 2001 Premiership before leaving for England where he played rugby union at fullback for the Worcester Warriors.

Hinshelwood won 19 caps for Scotland, making his debut against Canada in 2002 and a final Test appearance from the bench in last season's Six Nations fixture against Italy. He played in the World Cup in 2003 making four appearances before Scotland's exit in the quarter final stage to Australia national rugby union team.

He retired in December 2005 following a back injury. Two months previously he had announced that he was taking a break from international rugby but, after further medical advice called time on his career completely.

External links 
 Scottish Profile
 Retirement – Ben played key role in club's progress
 

1977 births
Living people
Australian people of Scottish descent
People educated at North Sydney Boys High School
Rugby union players from Melbourne
Scotland international rugby union players
Scottish rugby union players
Worcester Warriors players
Rugby union fullbacks
University of Sydney alumni